Copelatus bakewelli is a species of diving beetle. It is part of the genus Copelatus in the subfamily Copelatinae of the family Dytiscidae. It was described by J.Balfour-Browne in 1939.

References

bakewelli
Beetles described in 1939